P. Shanmugham (25 March 1927 – 2 February 2013) (Born to Panchanatha Mudaliyar - Gowri) was the Chief Minister of the Union Territory of Pondicherry. He served from 22 March 2000 to 27 October 2001.

A staunch loyalist of the Nehru-Gandhi family, he was in politics since 1950. He was the Leader of the Opposition between 1969 and 1973 when the DMK formed the government. He represented Puducherry in the Lok Sabha for three consecutive terms from 1980 and was elected to Puducherry Assembly thrice. He held the post of Puducherry Pradesh Congress Committee for about 33 years. He played key role in the formation of many governments in the Union Territory.

Notes 

Chief ministers of Puducherry
1927 births
2013 deaths
Indian National Congress politicians
Deaths from falls
Lok Sabha members from Puducherry
Chief ministers from Indian National Congress
Puducherry politicians
India MPs 1980–1984
India MPs 1984–1989
India MPs 1989–1991
Producers who won the Best Film on Family Welfare National Film Award